Sergey Kucherov (born July 18, 1980) is a Russian track cyclist. At the 2008 and 2012 Summer Olympics, he competed in the Men's team sprint for the national team.  They finished 12th and 7th respectively.

References

1980 births
Living people
Cyclists at the 2008 Summer Olympics
Cyclists at the 2012 Summer Olympics
Olympic cyclists of Russia
Sportspeople from Tula, Russia
Russian male cyclists
Russian track cyclists